Alyson is a given name, a variant form of Alison.

People with the given name Alyson
 Alyson (singer) (21st century), American singer
 Alyson Annan (born 1973), former field hockey player
 Alyson Bailes (born 1949), former English diplomat
 Alyson Brooks (born c. 1980), American theoretical astrophysicist
 Alyson Cambridge (born 1980), American operatic soprano and classical music, jazz, and American popular song singer
 Alyson Court (born 1973), Canadian actress
 Alyson Croft (born 1975), American actress
 Alyson Hannigan (born 1974), American actress
 Alyson Hau (born 1983), Hong Kong radio personality
 Alyson Hunter (born 1948), New Zealand photographer and print maker
 Alyson Jones (born 1956), former swimming champion
 Alyson Kennedy (born 1950), American Communist politician
 Alyson Kiperman (born 1977), American actress
 Alyson Michalka (born 1989), American actress and singer-songwriter.  Commonly known as Aly from the duo Aly and AJ.
 Alyson Reed (born 1958), American dancer and actress
 Alyson Rudd (born 1967), English sports journalist
 Alyson Spiro (21st century), British television actress
 Alyson Stoner (born 1993), American actress, singer and dancer.
 Alyson Williams (born 1962), African American rhythm and blues musician

Surname
Sasha Alyson (born 1952), American businessman

See also

 Alison (name)
 Allyson
 Alyson Avenue

Feminine given names
English feminine given names